Alice H. Armstrong was an American physicist known for her work at the National Bureau of Standards certifying the United States' radium supply. She was elected a Fellow of the American Physical Society in 1931.

Early life and education
Armstrong grew up in Waltham, Massachusetts and attended a two-room country schoolhouse until she entered Waltham High School, where she studied Latin, German and French. Her mother hoped that she would attend Smith College in Northampton, Massachusetts, but she chose Wellesley College instead after visiting there with a friend. At Wellesley, she originally intended to major in French and German, but she took a physics course on the advice of her older half-brother, an engineer, and she went on to earn a degree in physics with a minor in chemistry. Armstrong graduated from Wellesley in 1919.

Career 
Armstrong developed an interest in radioactivity during her time at Wellesley, and after graduating, she took a job at the National Bureau of Standards. The Bureau's radium laboratory had the responsibility of checking the quality and amount of radium samples, and the lab director was frequently absent due to a stomach ulcer. "So," Armstrong later recalled, "after only a few months, I found myself more or less in charge of certifying all the radium sold in the United States." After three years at the Bureau of Standards, Armstrong went to Radcliffe College for graduate studies, where she investigated X-ray spectroscopy with William Duane. During her graduate studies, she fell ill for half a year due to X-ray overexposure. She worked as an instructor at Wellesley, and then took an assistant position at the Rockefeller Institute for Medical Research in 1927.

In 1942, she held the office of secretary-treasurer for the New England section of the American Physical Society.

She returned again to Wellesley and became a professor of physics, eventually leaving in 1953 to conduct research at Los Alamos.

References

External links 

 Oral history interview with Alice Armstrong on 11 June 1979, American Institute of Physics, Niels Bohr Library & Archives - interview conducted by Katherine Sopka in Wellesley, Massachusetts

American women physicists
20th-century American physicists
Wellesley College alumni
Radcliffe College alumni
Wellesley College faculty
Fellows of the American Physical Society
Date of birth missing
Date of death missing
American women academics
20th-century women physicists
20th-century American women scientists